Crockleford Heath is part of the village and civil parish of Ardleigh in Essex. It is located 2½ miles south-west of the village centre.

Crockleford Heath once had its own school, built in about 1832 for the children of agricultural labourers; it later became a Church of England mission chapel.

A Primitive Methodist chapel was opened in Crockleford Heath in 1859.

References

Hamlets in Essex
Tendring